KOIL (1290 kHz) is a commercial AM radio station, licensed to Omaha, Nebraska.  It is owned by NRG Media (headquartered in Cedar Rapids, Iowa) and airs a Talk radio format.  KOIL's weekday schedule is mostly nationally syndicated talk shows such as Gordon Deal, Brian Kilmeade, Sean Hannity, Mark Levin, Jim Bohannon, Clyde Lewis and Chris Plante.  It also airs games from the Omaha Lancers junior ice hockey team.  KOIL's studios are located at Dodge Street and 50th Avenue in Midtown Omaha, and its transmitter site is located in Bellevue, Nebraska.  KOIL operates at 5,000 watts around the clock but at night it uses a directional antenna to protect other stations on 1290 kHz.

In the 1970s, KOIL had been one of Omaha's leading Top 40 stations, until September 2, 1976, when owner Don Burden had his station licenses revoked due to misconduct.

The station used the callsign KKAR from August 1993 until June 2012. The station returned to the original KOIL callsign at midnight local time on Monday, June 4, 2012.

History

The original KOIL
KOIL first signed on the air on July 10, 1925.  It was originally owned by the Mona Motor Oil Company (hence the "OIL" in the call letters) and was located in nearby Council Bluffs, Iowa.  It broadcast at 1080 AM before moving to 1290 AM. The station's location moved to Omaha in 1937.

KOIL was one of the stations that participated in the first CBS network radio broadcast on September 18, 1927. Its network affiliation switched to NBC December 1, 1931.

The station was purchased by salesman and promoter Don Burden in 1953, who later put a Top 40 format on KOIL. The station became part of Burden's Star Stations.

As a result of a Federal Communications Commission investigation into improprieties involving Burden and his stations—including alleged bribes Burden made to officials in charge of renewing the licenses of his stations, supervision of on-air contests, and lack of candor with the FCC—Burden was forced to surrender his radio licenses, and KOIL was ordered to go off the air in September 1976. The last song played by DJ Gene Shaw as it went off the air on September 2, 1976, was Simon & Garfunkel's "The Sound of Silence." The engineer on duty who turned off the transmitter after 51 years was Don Eliason. On Tom Becka's last segment, he also played the song as he signed off.

A new KOIL and a new license
Three months later, on December 16, 1976, KOIL resumed transmission under new ownership by Omaha businessman Nathan Novak.

In 1993, the KOIL call sign moved to 1180 AM in an exchange with station KKAR. In April 2003 it moved to 1020 AM, replacing KKSC (now KMMQ).  The call sign returned to 1180 kHz in January 2009; on June 4, 2012, KOIL was returned to 1290 AM and rebranded as the Mighty 1290 KOIL  and now includes live, local weekend programming from local hosts Thor Schrock, Darren Carlson, Sean McGwire and T.J. Bell

Announcers who once worked for KOIL include Roger W. Morgan, Gene Okerlund, Gary Michael Ross, Dr. Don Rose, Dick Sainte, and former Shindig! host Jimmy O'Neill; The Real Don Steele, Gary Owens, Kris Eric Stevens, Lyle Dean, Frank "Coffeehead" Allen, Joe Light, Dave Wingert, Sandy Jackson, and Tom Becka.

References

External links
News Talk 1290 KOIL - Official Website

"The Mighty 1290" KOIL tribute page

OIL
News and talk radio stations in the United States
Radio stations established in 1925
NRG Media radio stations